The Castle of Soure is a Portuguese castle in the civil parish of Soure, municipality of Soure, district of Coimbra. 

It has been listed as a National monument since 1949.

External links 
 Soure Castle at IPPAR 

Soure
Soure
Tourist attractions in Portugal